Thundercade, also known as Twin Formation and ", is a vertically scrolling shooter developed by SETA and released as an arcade game in 1987. A version for the Nintendo Entertainment System from American Sammy was released in 1989.

The NES version's manual describes a story, casting players as a part of Operation Thundercade, a special forces operation battling against the nuclear threat of  Atomic Age Terrorist Organization of Miracali (AATOM).

Gameplay

Players control a motorcycle equipped with sidecar cannons and backed up by a B-7 bomber. There are four levels in the game: an unnamed city, the terrorists' military base, the woodland regions, and the fortress containing the nuclear power plant. Bosses include a submarine along with other screen-filling enemies.

Reception 
In Japan, Game Machine listed Thundercade on their December 15, 1987 issue as being the seventh most-successful table arcade unit of the month.

References

1987 video games
Arcade video games
Micronics games
Nintendo Entertainment System games
Romstar games
Sammy games
SETA Corporation games
Multiplayer and single-player video games
Vertically scrolling shooters
Taito arcade games
Video games developed in Japan